The Association of Coeducational Schools (ACS) was formed in 1997 and commenced midweek sporting competitions for Years 7 – 12 in 1998 with five founding member schools that are coeducational and shared similar philosophies and a commitment to sport. These shared beliefs, commitment to sport and co-curricular events continue to drive the ACS today as demonstrated in our values.

Weekly Sport
Sport for all year levels is played during the week which enables a balanced lifestyle for students, allowing for family time and participation in community sport on weekends. ACS caters to diverse student interests and strengths by offering 13 weekly sports, played midweek, across summer and winter seasons, including mixed sports to foster strong interpersonal skills between genders.

Sports offered include: mixed badminton, basketball, cricket, Australian Rules football, football (soccer), futsal, hockey, netball, softball, table tennis, tennis, mixed touch football and volleyball.

Championship Carnivals
The ACS offers three major championships; athletics, swimming and cross country. Each carnival has its own unique quality which evokes a strong sense of community and camaraderie amongst students from different schools. These events are highly anticipated by our students who undertake dedicated training and skill development programs to achieve their best results and represent their schools with pride. The annual chess tournament and public speaking events are also part of the ACS calendar.

Member Schools

Associate member

Former members

See also 
 List of schools in Victoria

External links
 Loyola College
 Overnewton Anglican Community College
 St Leonard's College
 St Michael's Grammar School
 Thomas Carr College
 Westbourne Grammar School

References 

ACS Sports

Australian schools associations
Australian school sports associations
Organizations established in 1997